The United States Veterans Health Administration (VHA) has a lesbian, gay, bisexual and transgender (LGBT) Program through the Office of Patient Care Services. However, VHA does not currently collect data on veteran’s sexual orientation or gender identity. There are estimated to be more than one million LGBT Americans who are military veterans. If LGBT veterans use VHA at the same rate as non-LGBT veterans, there could be more than 250,000 LGBT veterans served by VHA. Using diagnostic codes in medical record data, Blosnich and colleagues found that the prevalence of transgender veterans in VHA (22.9/100,000) is five times higher than reported prevalence of transgender-related diagnoses in the general population (4.3/100,000). Brown and Jones identified 5,135 transgender veterans receiving care in VHA using a broader set of diagnostic codes.  Brown also notes that this methodology fails to identify transgender veterans who have not disclosed their gender identity to providers, those who don’t meet criteria for a diagnosis, or veterans who get their transition-related care outside of the VHA.

History
Two recent events increased focus on LGBT veterans in VHA. In 2011 VHA released a national transgender healthcare policy (VHA Directive 2011-024/later, 2013-003), which covers gender counseling, hormone therapy, pre-surgical evaluations, and post-surgical care, but transition surgeries are not currently covered. At least one report suggests an increase in veterans receiving transgender-related diagnoses in VHA since the transgender policy was released.  

The second event is related to the Department of Defense's repeal of its Don’t Ask, Don’t Tell policy in 2011, allowing openly gay, lesbian and bisexual military personnel to serve in the armed forces.  However, ending Don’t Ask, Don’t Tell did not change the military’s policy toward transgender people who continued to be banned from military service. Policy changes that allowed open transgender service were announced in June, 2016 and are effective October 1, 2016.  The repeal of Don’t Ask, Don’t Tell is expected to increase the numbers of LGB military personnel and consequently increase the number of LGB veterans who seek care at the VHA after service.

Concerns from LGBT veterans
Some researchers have raised concerns that LGBT veterans may not feel welcome at the VHA.  Sherman and coauthors found that 24% of a sample of 58 LGBT veterans had not disclosed their sexual orientation to any VHA provider.  The researchers noted that LGBT veterans may be uncomfortable disclosing their sexual orientation or gender identity because when they were in the military this information could lead to their discharge from service. Although VHA never had a policy prohibiting care to LGBT veterans, former military personnel often associate military policy with VHA policy.  Sherman and colleagues also found that some LGBT veterans worried that disclosing their sexual or gender minority status would lead to losing VA medical benefits, even though there is a Patient’s Rights and Responsibilities Policy that prevents this type of discrimination.  

In the same study, Sherman and colleagues examined attitudes and practices of 202 VHA providers at two mid-western hospitals and found that only half of providers had asked their patients about sexual orientation in the past year, despite it being relevant to health care.  Mental health providers were more likely to ask patients about sexual orientation than medical providers, perhaps due to an awareness of the stress associated with being a member of a minority group.  Less than half of the VHA providers overall (43%) had received any kind of training in LGBT health issues since they began practicing. 

LGBT people who disclose their sexual orientation to healthcare providers and feel comfortable talking to their providers about sexuality and sexual health also report greater satisfaction with their healthcare.  LGBT people, including LGBT veterans, have unique health needs that need screening and follow up, which require healthcare providers initiate conversations about sexuality and gender identity and expression with patients.

Responses from the Veterans' Health Administration
To address the healthcare needs of LGBT veterans and create a more welcoming environment at VHA facilities, as well as increase the competency of providers, VHA has taken several actions, starting with several policy changes. For example, patient and Department of Veterans Affairs (VA) employee  non-discrimination policies now include protections for sexual orientation, gender identity and expression and also have an inclusive definition of family. A policy on the rights of veterans’ family members includes a broad definition of “family” that allows LGBT veterans to decide who is regarded as part of their family. As mentioned above, VHA also issued a national transgender healthcare policy in 2011 and began training providers on transgender care. At present, VHA does not have a separate healthcare policy on LGB care, although such a policy is in development.

In 2011, VHA established the Office of Health Equity to work at a systems level to reduce health disparities in a number of vulnerable populations, including LGBT veterans, by raising awareness and advocating for healthcare system changes. One important activity by the Office of Health Equity has been their championing of VA facility participation in the Human Rights Campaign Healthcare Equality Index survey. In the most recent survey, 114 of 121 VA facilities participated in the HEI and 96 (84%) facilities received “Leader” status in LGBT patient care. To achieve “Leader” status in the HEI, agencies must demonstrate that they meet criteria in four domains: 1) patient non-discrimination policies; 2) equal visitation policies; 3) employment non-discrimination policies; and 4) training in LGBT patient-centered care.

To address clinical practice issues, in 2012 the VHA established the LGBT Program within the Office of Patient Care Services. The LGBT Program supports two internal websites (SharePoints) – one on LGB veteran care and one on transgender veteran care – which host archived staff trainings, links to policies, links to professional society guidelines, journal articles, facility information about LGBT support groups, and LGBT awareness campaign materials.  The LGBT program also worked with subject-matter experts to create on-demand webinars about transgender veteran healthcare for the VHA’s internal online educational platform and two webinars about LGB veteran healthcare for an Internet platform. These programs are now publicly available through VHA TRAIN, a free service of the Public Health Foundation, and VA eHealth University. 

The LGBT Program also worked to develop clinical support for VHA providers.  E-consultation on transgender care is available to any VHA provider at any facility through the veteran’s electronic health record. Providers asking a question get a case-specific response from an interdisciplinary team of experienced clinicians. The national e-consultation program began in 2014 and became completely national in spring 2015. In addition, interdisciplinary teams of providers can participate in an intensive training/case-consultation program through videoconferencing.  For this program, at minimum, a “team” consists of one behavioral health provider and one medical provider and meets with experts twice a month for one hour over seven months for a total of 14 sessions. The participating teams receive a 15-20 minute didactic presentation on a transgender care topic and the rest of the session is spent on case-based consultation. Each participating team presents 1-2 cases, while others listen and ask questions. By June 2016, 55 interdisciplinary teams of more than 370 providers will have completed this seven-month training.

Another training program consists of nine interprofessional postdoctoral psychology fellowships in LGBT health sponsored by the VHA Office of Academic Affiliations and Mental Health Services. The LGBT Program advises these nine fellowship sites, which include VA medical centers at Bedford, MA; Boston, MA; Chicago, IL; Honolulu, HI; Houston, TX; Milwaukee, WI; San Diego, CA; San Francisco, CA; and West Haven, CT. Fellows provide direct clinical services to LGBT veterans in a variety of clinical settings, as well as train staff and outreach to LGBT community agencies.

In addition to responding to the needs of LGBT Veterans, the VHA Office of Diversity and Inclusion (ODI) has taken steps to foster a supportive environment for LGBT employees. Employees enjoy the same discrimination protections as patients, including protections for sexual orientation and gender identity. For example, the Office of Personnel Management (OPM) offers protections to transgender VA employees, including access to sanitary facilities, use of preferred name and pronouns in employee files, and avenues through which to report workplace discrimination, as well as healthcare coverage for transition related care. Protections are in place for both sexual orientation and gender minority federal employees. ODI has established an LGBT Special Emphasis Program (SEP), which works to ensure that there is equal opportunity for LGBT employees to work at VHA facilities. One goal of the SEP is to establish a manager at each VHA facility who serves as the facility expert on LGBT policy and leads the staff in creating a welcoming environment to LGBT employees through educational activities and cultural competency trainings.

See also
 LGBT healthcare in prison

References

Further reading
 Department of Veteran Affairs marginalization and disenfranchisement of intersex veterans

External links
 Lesbian, Gay, Bisexual and Transgender Veteran Care, at Albuquerque.va.gov

LGBT and health care
LGBT people and military service in the United States
United States Department of Veterans Affairs